The fifth season of Superstore, the U.S. television series, was ordered on March 4, 2019 and filming began in August 2019. The season premiered on September 26, 2019 on NBC. The series continues to air in its Thursday at 8:00 PM timeslot. The season was set to contain 22 episodes, however production was shut down after the completion of the 21st episode due to the COVID-19 pandemic.

Superstore follows a group of employees working at Cloud 9, a fictional big-box store in St. Louis, Missouri. The ensemble and supporting cast features America Ferrera, Ben Feldman, Lauren Ash, Colton Dunn, Nico Santos, Nichole Bloom, Mark McKinney, and Kaliko Kauahi. Kauahi joins the regular cast after being credited as a recurring character in seasons 1–4.

Cast

Main
America Ferrera as Amy Sosa 
Ben Feldman as Jonah Simms
Lauren Ash as Dina Fox
Colton Dunn as Garrett McNeil
Nico Santos as Mateo Fernando Aquino Liwanag
Nichole Bloom as Cheyenne Thompson
Kaliko Kauahi as Sandra Kaluiokalani
Mark McKinney as Glenn Sturgis

Recurring
 Jon Barinholtz as Marcus White
 Kelly Stables as Kelly Watson
 Kelly Schumann as Justine Sikowitz
 Irene White as Carol
 Amir M. Korangy as Sayid
 Michael Bunin as Jeff Sutton
 Chris Grace as Jerry
 Justina Machado as Maya Fonseca
 David Wain as Dan the Optometrist
 Rory Scovel as Dr. Brian Patterson, Dina's new boyfriend

Guest cast
 Johnny Pemberton as Bo Derek Thompson
 Heidi Gardner as Colleen
 Kerri Kenney-Silver as Jerusha Sturgis
 Jerry Minor as Richard
 Fred Armisen as Kyle
 George Salazar as Eric Sosa
 Ian Gomez as Herb
 Dean Norris as Howard Fox
 Scott MacArthur as Benny
 Jason Ritter as Josh Simms, Jonah's brother
 Fred Melamed as Richard Simms, Jonah's father
 Meagen Fay as Marilyn Simms, Jonah's mother

Episodes

Production

Casting
It was announced on May 22, 2019 that Kaliko Kauahi, who portrays Sandra Kaluiokalani since the first season, has been promoted to series regular. On August 28, 2019 it was announced that Justina Machado  joined the cast as a recurring character, playing the new district manager Maya. Heidi Gardner was cast as Dina's nemesis Colleen.

America Ferrera’s departure
After NBC had initially announced the sixth season renewal of the series, the network revealed on February 28, 2020, that series star America Ferrera would be departing at the end of the fifth season, citing she has new projects and wants to spend more time with her family. However, due to season 5 production being halted by the COVID-19 pandemic, Ferrera returned to finish the story of Amy's departure in season 6.

Promotional Consideration
Episode 17 contained promotional consideration which was furnished by Microsoft.

Ratings

References

External links
 
 
 

Superstore (TV series)
2019 American television seasons
2020 American television seasons
Television productions suspended due to the COVID-19 pandemic